Alka Ajith is an Indian playback singer, best known for winning season 2 of Airtel Super Singer Junior, a Tamil language music competition reality TV show broadcast on Vijay TV. She was awarded the Jaycey Foundation Best Female Singer Award in 2017.

Early life 
Alka was born to M.P. Ajith Kumar and K. Sajitha.  Her paternal grandfather was a noted singer. Her father Ajith Kumar is a professional musician and organist, who runs Alka's orchestra, "Sangeeth Sagar". Alka first learnt music from her father. She studied in University of Madras in Chennai.

Musical career

Early life
Alka gave her first public performance when she was two and half years old in 2000, where she sang the Hindi language song, "Soldier ... ... Soldier... ". In 2001, she won International UNESCO Club of Repalle (A.P) award and gold medal, and in 2002, she won the Rotary International achievement award and gold medal.

When she was four years old, she cut her first audio album, "I love my India". In 2003, Alka entered the Limca Book of World Records, and won the title Bharatheeya Gourav Puraskar in New Delhi. In 2003, she won the Sauparnika Theeram Mini Screen Award, and Thalassery Drishya Kala's A. T. Ummer Award.

Before reaching the age of seven, Alka has sung more than 5,000 songs, could sing in 11 languages, and has given more than 500 concerts across India.

Airtel Super Singer Junior 
In 2010, Alka shot to fame after becoming the winner of Airtel Super Singer Junior (season 2), a Tamil language music competition reality TV show broadcast on Vijay TV. She regularly participated in the competition since 2009, and was crowned the winner of the competition.

She subsequently made appearances on Airtel Super Singer 3, and Airtel Super Singer Junior 4 as a guest performer.

Playback singing 
Alka made her debut as a playback singer with the song, "Chirakengu" in the Malayalam language movie The Train starring Mammootty after being spotted by Srinivas during the grand finale of Airtel Super Singer Junior (season 2).

In 2008, her debut music album Chakkaramuthu was released, consisting of songs she sang at the age of 10.

References 

Indian child singers
Living people
Women musicians from Kerala
Singers from Kerala
1997 births
Malayalam playback singers
Tamil playback singers
21st-century Indian singers
21st-century Indian women singers